The Dubrovnik Charter is a document from 1230, by which the Tsar Ivan Asen II of Bulgaria gives the Dubrovnik merchants the right to trade freely in his country.

The charter contains information about the territorial expansion of the Second Bulgarian State after the Battle of Klokotnitsa, as well as valuable data on the status of the Middle Bulgarian language in the 13th century. It is stored in the handwriting department of the Library of the Russian Academy of Sciences in St. Petersburg.

References 

Medieval charters and cartularies of Croatia

History of Dubrovnik
Second Bulgarian Empire
Middle Bulgarian language
Economic history of Bulgaria
Saint Petersburg
Russian Academy of Sciences